Tiltan School of Design and Visual Communications was founded in 1994 in Haifa, Israel, and is located on Independence Street in the city. It was the first college to be located on the Port Campus in Haifa, opposite the Port of Haifa.

Schools
Tiltan College of Visual Design and Communication is made up of six schools:
 School of Graphic Design
 School of Games and Application Design & Development
 School of Copywriting and Advertising
 School of Animation
 School of Interior Design
 School of Photography

Port Campus
The Port Campus is an academic complex established as part of a plan to rejuvenate the lower city area in Haifa. As part of the program, preserved buildings are used as student dormitories for higher education institutions.

, the port campus includes buildings of the Carmel Academic Center, Tiltan College of Visual Design and Communication, and the University of Haifa as well as student dormitories

Sources
 The Port Campus complex, Haifa Municipality
 Tiltan Profile

Haifa
Buildings and structures in Haifa
Education in Haifa
Universities in Israel
1994 establishments in Israel
Educational institutions established in 1994